Pakistan women's cricket team toured New Zealand in November 2016. The tour consisted of a series of five Women's One Day Internationals (WODIs), the last three being part of the 2014–16 ICC Women's Championship, and a Women's Twenty20 International (WT20I). New Zealand women won the WODI series 5–0 and won the one-off WT20I match by 14 runs.

Squads

ODI series

1st ODI

2nd ODI

3rd ODI

4th ODI

5th ODI

Only T20I

References

External links
 Series home at ESPN Cricinfo

International cricket competitions in 2016–17
Women's international cricket tours of New Zealand
2014–16 ICC Women's Championship
New Zealand 2016
2016 in New Zealand cricket
2016 in Pakistani cricket
cricket
2016 in women's cricket
2016 in Pakistani women's sport